The 1921 Cornell Big Red football team was an American football team that represented Cornell University as an independent during the 1921 college football season. In its second season under head coach Gil Dobie, Cornell compiled an 8–0 record, shut out five of eight opponents (including a 110–0 win over Western Reserve), and outscored all opponents by a total of 392 to 21. The 1921 season was part of 26-game winning streak that continued until October 1924 and included national championship claims for 1921, 1922, and 1923.

There was no contemporaneous system in 1921 for determining a national champion. However, Cornell was retroactively named as the national champion by  the Helms Athletic Foundation, Houlgate System, and National Championship Foundation, and as a co-national champion by Parke H. Davis.

Fullback Eddie Kaw was a consensus first-team selection on the 1921 All-American football team. Tackle Wilson S. Dodge was the team captain. Multiple Cornell players received All-Eastern honors: Kaw; quarterback George Pfann; halfbacks Floyd Ramsey and G.P. Lechler; ends Charles E. Cassidy and David Munns; guard Leonard C. Hanson; and tackle Wilson S. Dodge.

Schedule

References

Cornell
Cornell Big Red football seasons
College football national champions
College football undefeated seasons
Cornell Big Red football